The jōyō kanji system of representing written Japanese currently consists of 2,136 characters.

List of characters
 For brevity, only one English translation is given per kanji.
 The "Grade" column specifies the grade in which the kanji is taught in Elementary schools in Japan. Grade "S" means that it is taught in secondary school.
 The list is sorted by Japanese reading (on'yomi in katakana, then kun'yomi in hiragana), in accordance with the ordering in the official Jōyō table.
 This list does not include characters that were present in older versions of the list but have since been removed (勺, 銑, 脹, 錘, 匁).
 Hyphens in the kun'yomi readings separate kanji from their okurigana.
The "New" column attempts to reflect the official glyph shapes as closely as possible. This requires using the characters 𠮟, 塡, 剝, 頰 which are outside of Japan's basic character set, JIS X 0208 (one of them is also outside the Unicode BMP). In practice, these characters are usually replaced by the characters 叱, 填, 剥, 頬, which are present in JIS X 0208.
 The "Old" column reflects the official kyūjitai specified in the standard jōyō table; it does not include unofficial, extended, or Asahi characters.
 The readings presented here are those noted in the official Jōyō table. Special readings and uncommon readings are indicated in brackets. Other readings (generally less common, such as the nanori) may also exist.

See also
 Jōyō kanji
 List of kyōiku kanji
 Table of Japanese kanji radicals

Notes

External links

 Kanji Mnemonics by Henshall
 Kanji and translation from table as flashcards

 
Linguistics lists
Japanese writing system